Ikaria is one of the regional units of Greece. It is part of the region of North Aegean. The regional unit covers the island of Ikaria and the small archipelago Fournoi Korseon, in the Aegean Sea.

Administration

As a part of the 2011 Kallikratis government reform, the regional unit Ikaria was created out of part of the former Samos Prefecture. It is subdivided into 2 municipalities. These are (number as in the map in the infobox):

Ikaria (2)
Fournoi Korseon (3)

Province
The province of Ikaria was one of the provinces of the Samos Prefecture. It had the same territory as the present regional unit. It was abolished in 2006.

References

 
2011 establishments in Greece
Provinces of Greece
Regional units of the North Aegean